Clynton Lehman (born: 19 November 1971) is a sailor from Durban, South Africa. who represented his country at the 1996 Summer Olympics in Savannah, United States as crew member in the Soling. With helmsman Bruce Savage and fellow crew member Rick Mayhew they took the 17th place.

References

Living people
1971 births
Sailors at the 1996 Summer Olympics – Soling
Olympic sailors of South Africa
Sportspeople from Durban
South African male sailors (sport)